The Constitutional Right Party (from 1973 to 1980  Constitutional People's Party. ) was an anticommunist political party in Finland. The party was founded in 1973 by the parliamentarian Master in Law Georg C. Ehrnrooth as an anticommunist split from the Swedish People's Party (SFP).

The party had around 4,000 members. The party was founded as a response to SFP and the only major right-wing party, National Coalition, backing the re-election of President Urho Kekkonen by emergency law, simply for convenience and despite the lack of any national emergency. Ehrnrooth saw this as a sign of Finlandization, and held that the constitution was being circumvented and the people left out of the process.

The party contested the 1975 parliament election, obtaining 1.6% of the national vote and winning one seat. In the 1979 parliament election the party won 1.2% of the votes but no seat. The most seats the party ever held were two (1973–75 and 1986–87), although in both cases, one seat was gained by a defection.

At the 1978 Finnish presidential election, the party supported Ahti Salonen, a social democrat critical of Kekkonen and SDP's support of Kekkonen. At the 1982 election, however, the party supported Mauno Koivisto, in order to ensure Ahti Karjalainen, whom they regarded as too Soviet-friendly, would not succeed as a 'dark horse'.

Constitutional Right Party was the only Finnish political party which openly rallied Finland for joining the European Economic Community in 1988.

Constitutional Right Party rallied every 17 July in a big numbers because that date was the day when Finland got its Republican-based governmental basic rule in 1919.

Leaders

Chairmen
Ilpo Järvinen 1973–1974
Georg C. Ehrnrooth 1974–1992
Erkki Enberg 1992–1993
Tapio Väisänen 1993–?

Party secretaries
Peter Kankkonen
Panu Toivonen 1982–1990
Ulla Bogdanoff 1990–?

Vice chairmen
Kullervo Rainio 1978–1980
Markku Pietikäinen (1.) 1986–?
Tuula Heiman (2.) 1986–?
Matti Järviharju 1988–?
Pentti Taavitsainen 1990–?

Elections

References

1973 establishments in Finland
1993 disestablishments in Finland
Anti-communist parties
Anti-communist organisations in Finland
Conservative parties in Finland
Defunct political parties in Finland
Political parties disestablished in 1993
Political parties established in 1973
Political schisms